Pseudohermenias abietana is a species of moth of the family Tortricidae. It is found from Fennoscandia and northern Russia to the Pyrenees, Sardinia and Italy and from France to Romania.

The wingspan is 14–18 mm. Adults are on wing from May to July in one generation per year.

The larvae feed on Abies alba and Picea abies species. They mine the needles of their host plant. Current year's needles are mined out from a silken tube attached to a twig. Most frass is ejected into the tube. Older larvae vacate the mine and live freely, feeding among spun needles. The larvae are brownish with a shining black head. The species overwinters in the larval stage.

References

Olethreutini
Moths of Europe
Moths described in 1787
Taxa named by Johan Christian Fabricius